Henry Janeway Hardenbergh (February 6, 1847 – March 13, 1918) was an American architect, best known for his hotels and apartment buildings, and as a "master of a new building form — the skyscraper."

Life and career
Hardenbergh was born in New Brunswick, New Jersey, of a Dutch family, and attended the Hasbrouck Institute in Jersey City.  He apprenticed in New York from 1865 to 1870 under Detlef Lienau, and, in 1870, opened his own practice there.

He obtained his first contracts for three buildings at Rutgers College in New Brunswick, New Jersey—the expansion of Alexander Johnston Hall (1871), designing and building Geology Hall (1872) and the Kirkpatrick Chapel (1873)—through family connections.  Hardenbergh's great-great grandfather, the Reverend Jacob Rutsen Hardenbergh, had been the first president of Rutgers College from 1785 to 1790, when it was still called "Queen's College".

He then got the contract to design the "Vancorlear" on West 55th Street, the first apartment hotel in New York City, in 1879. The following year he was commissioned by Edward S. Clark, then head of the Singer Sewing Machine Company, to build a housing development. As part of this work, he designed the pioneering Dakota Apartments in Central Park West, novel in its location, very far north of the center of the city.

Subsequently, Hardenbergh received commissions to build the Waldorf (1893) and the adjoining Astoria (1897) hotels for William Waldorf Astor and Mrs. Astor, respectively. The two competing hotels were later joined together as the Waldorf-Astoria, which was demolished in 1929 for the construction of the Empire State Building.

Hardenbergh lived for some time in Bernardsville, New Jersey the town in which he designed the building for the school house built with funds donated by Frederic P. Olcott.  The school house is in Hardenberghs architectural style and is a landmark in the town.  Hardenbergh died at his home in Manhattan, New York City on March 13, 1918. He is buried in Woodland Cemetery, in Stamford, Connecticut.

Organizations
Hardenbergh was elected to the American Institute of Architects in 1867, and was made a Fellow in 1877. He was president of the Architectural League of New York from 1901 to 1902, and was an associate of the National Academy of Design.  Hardenbergh was one of the founders of the American Fine Arts Society as well as the Municipal Art Society.  He was also a member of the Sculpture Society and the Century, Riding, Grolier and Church Clubs.

Buildings
 1870: Addition to the Rutgers Preparatory School building (now Alexander Johnston Hall) in New Brunswick, New Jersey.
 1871–1872: library, chapel and Geology Hall, at Rutgers College (now university), in New Brunswick, New Jersey.
 1873: Sophia Astley Kirkpatrick Memorial Chapel at Rutgers College, New Brunswick, New Jersey, with windows by Louis Comfort Tiffany (renovated 1916)
 1873: Suydam Hall at New Brunswick Theological Seminary in New Brunswick, New Jersey (razed 1966)
 1876: Kingfisher Tower near Cooperstown, New York
 1878: Windsor Hotel in Montreal (demolished except for North Annex, 1975
 1879: The Vancolear, West 55th Street and Seventh Avenue, the city's first apartment hotel
 1879: Loch Ada, 590 Proctor Road, Glen Spey, Lumberland, Sullivan County, New York (razed 1996)
 1879–1880: two row houses at 101 and 103 West 73rd Street in Manhattan, New York City 
 1880–1884: The Dakota Apartments located on Manhattan's Upper West Side, in New York City (NYC landmark)
 1882–1884: Western Union Telegraph Building, located at 186 Fifth Avenue at 23rd Street in Manhattan, New York City
 1882–1885: Several Row houses at 15A-19 and 41-65 West 73rd Street on Manhattan's Upper West Side, New York City
 1883: Hotel Albert (now the Albert Apartments) in Manhattan, New York City
 1883-84: 1845 Broadway in Manhattan, New York City
 1886–1887: 337 & 339 East 87th Street, Manhattan, New York City
 1888: Schermerhorn Building at 376-380 Lafayette Street in Manhattan, New York City
 1888–1889: Apartment building at 121 East 89th Street part of the Hardenbergh/Rhinelander Historic District 
 1888–1889: Row houses at 1340, 1342, 1344, 1346, 1348 and 1350 Lexington Avenue part of the Hardenbergh/Rhinelander Historic District 
 1891–1892: American Fine Arts Society building, home of the Art Students League of New York, in Manhattan, New York City (NYC landmark)
 1893: Waldorf Hotel located at 34th Street and Fifth Avenue in Midtown Manhattan, New York City (demolished 1929 to build Empire State Building)
 1893: Hotel Manhattan located on the northwest corner of Madison Avenue and 42nd Street in New York City, New York. 
 1895: Wolfe Building, at William Street and Maiden Lane, New York City (demolished in 1974)
 1897: Astoria Hotel located at 34th Street and Fifth Avenue in Midtown Manhattan, New York City (demolished 1929 to build Empire State Building)
 1897: William Murray Houses, located at 13 and 15 West 54th Street, Manhattan, New York City (NYC landmark)
 1897–1900: Hotel Martinique on Broadway in Manhattan, New York City (enlarged 1907-11) a NYC landmark 
 1900–1901: Textile Building on Leonard Street and Church Street in Manhattan, New York City (penthouse added in 2001) a NYC landmark 
1901: Willard Hotel in Washington, D.C.
 1902: Sunnyside Island, in the 1000 Islands, New York
 1902–1904: Whitehall Building in Manhattan, New York City (NYC landmark)
 1903: Preston B. Moss House, 914 Division St., Billings, Montana
 1904: All Angels' Church – Manhattan, New York City
 1904: Van Norden Trust Company Building, 751 5th Ave., New York City, demolished.
 1905–1907: Plaza Hotel at corner of Fifth Avenue and Central Park South (West 59th Street) in Midtown Manhattan, New York City a NYC landmark 
 1908: Trinity Episcopal Church in York Harbor, Maine
 1910: Palmer Physical Laboratory, at Princeton University
 1911: The Raleigh Hotel at 1111 Pennsylvania Avenue, in Washington D.C. (demolished 1965)
 1912: Copley Plaza Hotel in Boston, Massachusetts
 1912: Stamford Trust Company Building, 300 Main St., Stamford, Connecticut
 1914: Palmer Stadium, the football stadium and track arena at Princeton University, in Princeton, New Jersey (demolished 1998)
 1915: Consolidated Edison Company Building in Manhattan, New York City (the building only, not the tower)
 1917–1918: New Jersey Zinc Company Headquarters, Maiden Lane, Manhattan, New York City.

Gallery

See also

References
Notes

External links

 Henry J. Hardenbergh Architectural Database

1847 births
1918 deaths
People from Bernardsville, New Jersey
Artists from New Brunswick, New Jersey
19th-century American architects
Hardenbergh family

American people of Dutch descent
Burials in Connecticut
Waldorf Astoria New York
Fellows of the American Institute of Architects
Members of the American Academy of Arts and Letters